Rise Up! Shteyt Oyf! is an album by the American klezmer group the Klezmatics. It was released in 2003.

Production
"I Ain't Afraid" is a cover of the Holly Near song. "Barikadn" samples the voice of the activist Shmerke Kaczerginski.

Critical reception
Robert Christgau wrote: "Leaning on the mournful Eastern European modalities the shtetl assimilated long ago—check especially the Matt Darriau threnody and Frank London prayer—the Klezmatics conjure an album as soaked in 9/11 as The Rising, whose similar title is no coincidence."

AllMusic wrote that "the emphasis is most definitely on songs, rather than instrumentals, and for the most part they keep their fire quite restrained, rarely letting the instrumental work fly into the stratosphere as they have in the past."

Track listing 
 Klezmorimlekh mayne libinke
 Kats un Moyz
 Loshn-Koydesh
 Tepel
 I Ain't Afraid
 Di Gayster
 Yo Riboyn Olam
 Bulgars #2
 Barikadn
 Davenen
 St. John's Nign
 Hevil iz Havolim
 Makht oyf!
 Perets-Tanst
 I Ain't Afraid (English edit)

References

The Klezmatics albums
2003 albums